The Isnag people (also referred to as the Isneg and Apayao) are an Austronesian ethnic group native to Apayao Province in the Philippines' Cordillera Administrative Region.  Their native language is Isneg (also called Isnag), although most Isnag also speak Ilokano.

Two major sub-groups among the Isnag are known: the Ymandaya, mostly concentrated in the municipality of Calanasan; and the Imallod, with populations distributed among the other towns of the province.  Isnag populations can also be found in the eastern part of the adjacent Provinces of Ilocos Norte and Cagayan.

Name 
Various names have been used to differentiate the Isnag. The Spaniards referred to them as los Apayaos (referring to the river along which they live) and los Mandayas (taken from the Isnag term meaning “upstream”). In 1923, they were the last ethnic group to be conquered by the American colonialists. Before, they had no collective name. Instead, they referred to themselves based on their residence or whether they lived: upstream (Imandaya) or downstream (Imallod). At present, they are commonly known as Isnegs, which came from an Ilocano word itneg that means Inhabitants of the Tineg River. Some of them, however, still call themselves as Apayaos.

Geography 
The Isnegs are native in Apayao province, which was formerly a sub-province of Mountain Province, but are also found in portions of Abra, Ilocos Norte, & Kalinga. Apayao has an area of 397,720 hectares and is typographically divided into two parts: the Upper Apayao that is mountainous, and the Lower Apayao that is generally flat with rolling mountains and plateaus. Today, there are about 40,000 Isnegs living in Apayao. Isnag populations can also be found in the Eastern part of the Province of Ilocos Norte, specifically the municipalities of Adams, Carasi, Dumalneg and Solsona; and in the Northwestern part of the Province of Cagayan, specifically the municipalities of Sta. Praxedes, Claveria and Sanchez Mira. The majority of them live along the Apayao River-Abulog River, Matalag River, and the small rivers on the hillsides of Ilocos Norte and Abra.

Social organization 
Because there was no political or ward system, the kinship groups and family clans became the central social organizations and were usually led by the husbands. Polygamy is allowed, but depends on the capacity of the husband to support the family. Like other ethnic groups, they also follow a lot of taboos. These taboos vary from place to place. A pregnant woman, for example, is discouraged to eat some kinds of sugarcane, banana, and the soft meat of sprouting coconut to have a normal conception. In the past, twins were also believed to be unlucky, so whenever twins were born, they would let the weaker twin die. Also, if the mother dies upon giving birth, the child is also left to die and is usually buried with the mother. The Isnegs don’t follow rituals on the adolescence of the child. They, however, have rituals on marriage, like the amoman (or the present-day pamamanhikan), and death, like the mamanwa which is done by the widowers.

Isneg houses (balay) are two-story, one-room structures built on 4 corner posts with an entrance reached by a ladder.  The open space below (linong or sidong) includes a small shed (abulor) for jars of basi.  The bamboo pigpen(dohom) is nearby.  Rice granaries (alang) are also made on four posts that include a circular and flat rat shield.  Temporary buildings associated with upland and swidden farming are called sixay.  Their bolo (badang) and axe (aliwa) are important tools.  They are also expert fishermen.

Culture 
Isneg, or Isnag, kinship is bilateral, meaning children are equally related to both the mother and the father.  Households consist of interrelated families living close to each other, and extended families of three generations living together in their balay.  The family is the key element in society, the larger the better, headed by the husband.  No other society structure exists, though brave men, mengals, lead in hunting and fishing.  The bravest, Kamenglan, is the overall leader.  A young man entered their ranks after the first headhunting expedition.  A mengal carries a red kerchief on the head and has tattoos on his arms and shoulders.  They are animistic and practice polygamy.

Language 
Isneg language is spoken by around 30,000 people mostly by the Isnag people, who are also bilingual in Ilokano.

Religion 
Approximately 9% of the population are Christians.  As of 2006, the entire New Testament, along with the books of Genesis and Exodus, had been translated into Isnag by SIL. Rest of the Isnags are mainly animists.

Clothing 

The Isnegs are aesthetically-inclined. In ceremonies, women wear a lot of colourful ornaments and clothings, and men wear G-strings (usually of blue color), abag, and bado (upper garment). Men don’t wear pendants but they wear an ornament called sipattal, made of shells and beads, used only on special occasions. They also practice tattooing which is done by rubbing soot on the wounds caused by the needles.

Cuisine 
The isnegs traditionally only consume two meals a day; one in the mid-morning and one in the late afternoon, or one at noon and the other in the evening. Though most of their meals include rice, rice is always scarce because of the limited womanpower. Hence, they resort to trade to satisfy demands. Meals also include vegetables and root crops such as camote and occasionally, fish and wild pig or wild deer. Dogs, pigs and chickens are only eaten during feasts and chicken eggs are seldom eaten because they are generally allowed to hatch. Sometimes, before or after meals, the typical isneg families enjoy home-grown coffee while gathering around the hearth while rice wine is only consumed during festive occasions.

They were proud of using bamboo as cooking utensils. They have sinursur, a dish made of catfish or eel on bamboo with chili, abraw,  freshwater crabs with coconut and chili, sinapan, which looks like smoked meat. They used anything they can find in nature as food, from brooks, rivers, lakes and streams, they catch fish and other creatures in it. In forests, they use any edible leaves in there. They douse the harvest in cooking it with chili.

Funeral practices 
The Isnag wrap the deceased person in a mat (ikamen), and is then carried on the shoulders of the immediate male family members. Items are placed inside the coffin in order to help the deceased person throughout his/her journey. For example, a jar (basi) is placed in the coffin to quench the deceased one's thirst. Another example is a spear and shield also being put inside in order to help him/her protect himself/herself from enemies during the journey. The coffin is then lowered into either the kitchen area of their families home or in a burial site owned by his/her family.

Early accounts of the Isnag
The Isnag are distinguished from the other Cordillerans by the fine construction of their houses, resembling that of the lowland Filipinos, and they are particularly conspicuous about cleanliness. Their houses are set on four large and strong straight posts of incorruptible wood resistant to humidity, driven into the earth; instead of being made of bamboo cut in long narrow strips joined by rattan, as the lowland Filipinos do. Their houses are airy and bigger, and they do everything to decorate it the best way they can. They barter for products from their mountains, such as beeswax, cacao, and tobacco.
Jean Mallat, a French adventurer in the Philippines during the 1800s.

See also
Dibagat
Isnag language
Isnag in the Provinces of Ilocos Norte and Cagayan

References

External links
Isneg by Arlene Sapanza

Igorot